Yosef Aharon Almogi (May 5, 1910 – November 2, 1991) was an Israeli politician who served as a member of the Knesset between 1955 and 1977, as well as holding several ministerial posts.

Biography
Born Josef Karlenboim in Hrubieszów in the Russian Empire (today in Poland), he joined the Dror movement in 1924 and moved to Mandate Palestine in 1930. He served as a commander of the Haganah in Kfar Saba, Tel Aviv (1936) and Haifa (1937). In 1940, he enlisted in the British Army, and fought in Greece. He was captured and spent the remainder of the War in a German POW camp.

Upon returning to Israel after the war, Almogi became active in politics and joined David Ben-Gurion's Mapai. He was active in the Haifa Workers Council, serving as Alternate Secretary from 1947 to 1951 and then Secretary from 1951 to 1959. He was the General Secretary of Mapai from 1959 to 1961.

First elected to the Knesset in the 1955 elections, Almogi was made Minister without Portfolio after the 1961 elections, before taking over the roles of Minister of Housing and Minister of Development in October 1962. When Levi Eshkol replaced Ben-Gurion as PM in 1963, Almogi kept both positions.

However, when Ben-Gurion led a breakaway from Mapai to form Rafi shortly before the 1965 elections, Almogi followed, losing his cabinet position in the process. Elected back to the Knesset on Rafi's list, Almogi became Minister of Labour in July 1968 when together with Mapam, Rafi merged into Eshkol's Alignment (a merger of Mapai and Ahdut HaAvoda). He retained his position after the 1969 elections, but was not included in Golda Meir's cabinet after the 1973 elections.

During his last term in the Knesset, Almogi also briefly served as the mayor of Haifa (1974–1975). He then served as chairman of the World Zionist Organization from 1975 to 1978 and head of the Jewish Agency Executive from 1976 to 1978.

He died in Haifa on November 2, 1991.

Bibliography

References

The Central Zionist Archives in Jerusalem site. The Office of Yosef Almogi (S85), Personal papers (AK292).

External links

1910 births
1991 deaths
People from Hrubieszów
Jews from the Russian Empire
Polish emigrants to Mandatory Palestine
Jews in Mandatory Palestine
Israeli people of Polish-Jewish descent
Mapai politicians
Rafi (political party) politicians
Israeli Labor Party politicians
Mayors of Haifa
Heads of the Jewish Agency for Israel
Haganah members
British Army personnel of World War II
Members of the 3rd Knesset (1955–1959)
Members of the 4th Knesset (1959–1961)
Members of the 5th Knesset (1961–1965)
Members of the 6th Knesset (1965–1969)
Members of the 7th Knesset (1969–1974)
Members of the 8th Knesset (1974–1977)
World War II prisoners of war held by Germany
Ministers of Development of Israel
Ministers of Housing of Israel
Ministers of Labour of Israel
Ministers without Portfolio of Israel